Wolfram Löwe (born 14 May 1945 in Markranstädt) is a former German footballer.

Career

Club career
Löwe played almost whole his career for 1. FC Lokomotive Leipzig (1963–1980).

International career
On the national level he played for the East Germany national team – making his début on 17 May 1967 in Helsingborg against Sweden. Löwe was a participant at the 1974 FIFA World Cup.

Career statistics

Club

International
.

International goals
Scores and results list East Germany's goal tally first.

References

External links
 
 
 
 
 Wolfgang Löwe profile at lok-leipzig-db.com

1945 births
Living people
People from Markranstädt
German footballers
East German footballers
Footballers from Saxony
Association football forwards
DDR-Oberliga players
1. FC Lokomotive Leipzig players
East Germany international footballers
1974 FIFA World Cup players
Olympic footballers of East Germany
Footballers at the 1976 Summer Olympics
Olympic gold medalists for East Germany
Olympic medalists in football
Medalists at the 1976 Summer Olympics
Recipients of the Patriotic Order of Merit in silver